The Partida Națională was a Romanian political party which existed in both Danubian Principalities from ca. 1700 to 1859, comprising those boyars who opposed foreign interference. It was a loose group which helped to popularize Romanian nationalism, and finally the union of the Principalities.

See also
Liberalism and radicalism in Romania

Defunct political parties in Romania